SofaScore is an application software for following sports statistics and results. The app is owned and developed by SofaIT from Zagreb, Croatia. In 2020, the app had 20 million users. It covers 20 different sports and around 11,000 different leagues and tournaments, and is available in more than 30 different languages.

The app founders are Ivan Bešlić and Zlatko Hrkać, who previously worked on other Internet projects during the era of "blogs and forums". They started the app for collecting sports results in 2010. After noticing large traffic on their site, Google invited them to Dublin in 2011. That year they formed a small office for programme developers. In 2012, just before the UEFA Euro 2012, they changed the apps' name to SofaScore in order to develop a brand.

They developed a system of assessment of athletes' performances which differentiated them from other similar existing apps and gave them leverage in the market. The system also enables the tracking and assessment of young players from lower-tier leagues, that otherwise wouldn't get attention.

Most users are from footballing countries like Germany, Italy, France, and the United Kingdom. The app is also much used in South America and Africa. In Africa, a special version of the app is available for low internet connectivity.

Footnotes

References 

 
 

Internet properties established in 2010
2010 establishments in Croatia
Croatian sport websites
iOS software
Companies based in Zagreb